Zevenaar is a railway station located in Zevenaar, Netherlands. The station was opened on 15 February 1856 and is located on the Winterswijk–Zevenaar railway and the Oberhausen–Arnhem railway. There used to be a connection to Kleve (Germany) as well (from 1865-1914). Since 6 April 2017, the station has a direct train to Germany once again, but this time to Düsseldorf instead of Kleve. The train services are operated by Arriva, Breng and Abellio Deutschland.

Train services

Bus services

References

External links
NS website
Arriva website 
Dutch Public Transport journey planner

Railway stations in Gelderland
Railway stations opened in 1856
Buildings and structures in Zevenaar